Elaeophora bohmi is a nematode parasite found in various arteries of the horse.  The adult males are 44-55 mm long and 95 µm wide, while adult females can be over 12 cm long and 210 µm wide. Microfilariae are not sheathed, and measure 300-330 µm long and 6-7 µm wide.  The life cycle and clinical symptoms of infestation by E. bohmi have not been described.

Discovery and nomenclature
Elaeophora bohmi was first described in 1953, from adults found in the arteries and veins in the extremities of Austrian horses. In 1976, some authors considered it to be a species of the genus Onchocerca -- Onchocerca bohmi (Supperer 1953) Bain et al., 1976 -- but most recent parasitology texts still refer to this species as Elaeophora bohmi.

Hosts and geographic distribution
So far, E. bohmi has only been found in horses (Equus caballus) in Austria and Iran.  Adults were found in the medial layer or outside layer of tissues within the artery wall.

Life cycle 
The life cycle of E. bohmi has not been studied.

Prevalence and clinical significance 
In the original species description, Supperer found E. bohmi in 6.7% of the Austrian horses examined.  A survey of blood samples found E. bohmi microfilariae in 8.69% of Iranian horses examined, but none in donkeys or mules.  Clinical symptoms of infestation have not been described.

References 

Spirurida
Parasitic nematodes of mammals
Veterinary helminthology
Parasites of equines
Nematodes described in 1953